Ilex longipes, commonly called the Georgia holly, is a species of plant in the holly family. It is native to the southeastern United States, where it has a patchy distribution. It is typically found in upland forests.

Ilex longipes is a large shrub or small tree. It produces small white flowers in the spring and red berries in the fall.

It has a similar appearance to Ilex cuthbertii and Ilex decidua, which it is sometimes considered a variety of.

References

longipes
Taxa named by William Trelease
Taxa named by Alvan Wentworth Chapman